This is a survey of the postage stamps and postal history of Montenegro.

Early postal history

During the first part of the 19th century private letters from Montenegro are very rare. It is mainly official and ecclesiastical letters carried by couriers that are to be found.

Austrian post offices
In 1854 an Austrian Post Office, operated by Österreichischer Lloyd, was opened in Antivari, then in the Ottoman Empire, now known as Bar; this office was closed in 1878 when the town was returned to Montenegro. The stamps used during this period were the issues for Austrian post offices in the Ottoman Empire.

First stamps of Montenegro
The first stamps to be issued by Montenegro were in 1874 which coincided with the opening of the first post office for public use. The design of the stamps had a bust of Prince Nicholas. 

In 1893 seven different values of the existing stamps were overprinted to commemorate the 400th Anniversary of introduction of printing into Montenegro. In 1896 a range of 12 stamps were issued for the bicentenary of the Petrović-Njegoš dynasty. 1902 saw the introduction of new currency and new stamps with a new design and a new bust of Prince Nicholas.

Montenegro was one of the few European countries to issue a stamp for the Avis de réception service.

Twentieth century
In 1905 a new Constitution was passed in Montenegro and this resulted in existing stamps being overprinted to commemorate the event. Another change in currency in 1907 produced new stamps with another design incorporating the bust of Prince Nicholas.

On the 50th anniversary of the reign of Prince Nicholas, in 1910, he was crowned King of Montenegro and the principality was proclaimed a kingdom. This resulted in a new range of stamps being issued to commemorate this event.

In 1912 a new set of definitive stamps incorporating the bust of King Nicholas was issued.

Austro-Hungarian occupation

March 1917 overprint
Austria-Hungary occupied Montenegro in 1915. Austro-Hungarian military stamps were overprinted  and issued in 1917.
Only 2 stamps were officially issued by Austria-hungary during World War I on 1 March 1917: 10 heller and 15 heller Feldpostmarken with a double vertical overprint K.u.K. Milit.-Verwaltung Montenegro. The general public, however, used stamps of Austria during the occupation.

Non-official overprint
Stamps with horizontal Montenegro overprint are not official nicht verausgabte, and were printed for the first anniversary of Austrian troops occupation

Kingdom of Serbs, Croats and Slovenes 

On 13 November 1918 Montenegro was united with Serbia. In 1922 it became part of the Kingdom of Serbs, Croats and Slovenes. Then in 1929 this became the Kingdom of Yugoslavia.

WWII
Montenegro was occupied by Italy in 1941. The Protectorate of Montenegro was established and issued stamps until 1943. After the withdrawal of Italy from the war, the territory of Montenegro was occupied by Germany in September 1943.

Kotor issues 
In April 1941, Kotor and the adjacent territories of the Montenegrin coast were annexed and incorporated into Italy as the Province of Cattaro of the Governorate of Dalmatia. After Italy surrendered to the Allies, the territory of the province of Cattaro was occupied by German troops in September 1943. Stamps were issued under the German military administration for Kotor in 1944.

Post war
After 1944 Montenegro became part of the federal republic of Yugoslavia and then the Union of Serbia and Montenegro in 2003.

Modern Montenegro

Stamps for Montenegro again resumed issuing in 2005. Montenegro declared independence on 3 June 2006.

Postal stationery

The postal stationery issued by Montenegro used the same designs as those used for stamps.

Postcards were first issued in 1888, envelopes and newspaper wrappers in 1893, and lettercards in 1894. The design of all these was the bust of Prince Nicholas as first used for stamps in 1874.

In 1893, only envelopes and postcards were overprinted to commemorate the 400th anniversary of introduction of printing into Montenegro.

In 1896 all the different items of stationery were issued for 200th anniversary of Petrovich Niegush Dynasty.

The 1902 new stamp design of the bust of Prince Nicholas was also employed on all the items of postal stationery.

In 1906, envelopes, lettercards and postcards were overprinted to commemorate the granting of the constitution.

The 1907 and 1912 (in 1913) stamp designs were also used on all four items of postal stationery.

References

Further reading
 Brunel, Georges. Les Timbres-poste du Monténégro. Bischwiller: "Timbre-poste", 1926 19p.
 Fleck, Vladimir. Die Briefmarken von Montenegro. Frankfurt am Main: [Arbeitsgemeinschaft Neues Handbuch der Briefmarkenkunde], 1962 52p.
 Phillips, Stanley. "Montenegro: A Reference List with Notes." Stanley Gibbons Monthly Journal. Vol. 17 Nos. 200 & 201 (Feb. & Mar. 1907).
 Robinson, Keith. The Postal History of Independent Montenegro. U.K.: Yugoslavia Study Group, 2013.

External links

 Montenegro at the Encyclopedia of Postal History
 Montenegro Post

Austria–Montenegro relations
Philately of Montenegro
Philately of Austria
Military history of Austria-Hungary